Renato Marotta (born 16 November 1974 in Salerno) is an Italian actor and director.

References

External links

Italian male actors
Italian film directors
People from Salerno
1974 births
Living people